Minretumomab (CC49) is a mouse monoclonal antibody that was designed for the treatment of cancers that express the TAG-72 antigen. This includes breast, colon, lung, and pancreatic cancers. Apparently, it never got past Phase I clinical trials for this purpose.

Derivatives 
A wide range of derivatives has been used in pharmaceutical research. Examples include chimeric and humanized minretumomab, as well as a fusion protein of a minretumomab single-chain variable fragment and the enzyme beta-lactamase.

Radiopharmaceuticals
Iodine (125I) minretumomab is an iodine-125 radiolabelled derivative that was developed for the detection of tumours in radioimmunoassays such as CA 72-4.

Radiolabelled minretumomab has also been tested for the treatment of solid tumours, but without success. Iodine (131I) and lutetium (177Lu) minretumomab, for example, were shown to induce human anti-mouse antibodies; no tumour response was observed in Phase I and II clinical trials.

References 

Monoclonal antibodies for tumors